The Chevrolet Agile is a subcompact car that was developed by Chevrolet in Brazil and built in Argentina.
Based on the "GPiX Concept" which was introduced at the 2008 São Paulo Auto Show, the Agile went on sale in 2009 and competes with the Volkswagen Fox and similar models. The second generation Chevrolet Montana coupé utility shares the same platform with Agile. The Chevrolet Agile is powered by a Family 1 engine 1.4 L flex-fuel engine.

Features

The Agile was available in two trim levels; LT and LTZ, with a base LS in some markets. Anti-lock braking systems are available on the LTZ model.

Engines

Safety
The Chevrolet Agile in its most basic Latin American configuration with no airbags and no ABS has been rated as totally unsafe by Latin NCAP in 2013, scoring zero stars for adult occupants and two stars for children.

Replacement
General Motors launched the Chevrolet Onix in 2012 to replace Chevrolet Celta. However, the close size to Agile has made its future uncertain.

Production of the Agile ended in 2016 with the Onix finally succeeding it.

References

Agile
Subcompact cars
Cars introduced in 2009
Cars of Brazil
2010s cars
Latin NCAP superminis